Kalathur West is a village in Kalathur Panchayat in Thanjavur District in the state of Tamil Nadu, in southeastern India.Kalathur West is located at .

Villages in Thanjavur district